Joshua Michael Bull (born 4 April 1985) is an Australian politician. He has been a Labor Party member of the Victorian Legislative Assembly since November 2014, representing the seat of Sunbury.

Early life and education 
Bull was born in Sunbury, Victoria in 1985. He attended Sunbury Heights Primary, and graduated from Sunbury College as school captain in 2002. He went on to study at Deakin University from 2004 to 2007, undertaking a double degree in education and science. 

After completing his degree Bull became a teacher.

Political career 
He began his political career as an electorate officer for former Yuroke MP, Liz Beattie. He has also been chief of staff to Federal Member for McEwen, Rob Mitchell. Bull has been actively involved with the ALP since 2003, serving as the Craigieburn Branch secretary for six years, a state conference delegate for three years, a member of the Education and Youth Affairs Policy Committee and the Sport, Culture and Tourism Policy Committee. 

Bull was accepted into the Australian Defence Force as an Army Reservist Officer cadet in 2013, though has been on leave due to work commitments. Josh is also a keen runner with Melbourne running club 'The Crosbie Crew'. He completed his first marathon in 2014.

References

External links
 Parliamentary voting record of Josh Bull at Victorian Parliament Tracker

|-

1985 births
Living people
Australian Labor Party members of the Parliament of Victoria
Members of the Victorian Legislative Assembly
Deakin University alumni
21st-century Australian politicians
Politicians from Melbourne
People from Sunbury, Victoria